Morse Mill is an unincorporated community in western Jefferson County, Missouri, United States. It is located approximately five miles northwest of Hillsboro along Missouri Route B. The community and mill were located along Big River.

A post office called Morse Mill has been in operation since 1859. The community is named after John H. Morse, the proprietor of a local mill.

Notable person
 Bertha Gifford (1871-1951), serial killer who murdered approximately 17 people

References

Unincorporated communities in Jefferson County, Missouri
Unincorporated communities in Missouri